Théniet El Had is a district in Tissemsilt Province, Algeria. It was named after its capital, Théniet El Had. Théniet El Had National Park is there.

Municipalities
The district is further divided into 2 municipalities:
Théniet El Had
Sidi Boutouchent 

Districts of Tissemsilt Province